Wet transformer may refer to:

 A, usually large, transformer filled with transformer oil
 A telephone line isolation transformer circuit in which the line hold DC current is allowed to pass through the primary winding